PGD may refer to:

Science and medicine
 Patient group directions, documents in the National Health Service of England

 Platform gate doors, a term referring to waist or chest height platform screen doors
 Preimplantation genetic diagnosis, genetic profiling of embryos prior to implantation
 Primary graft dysfunction, a complication of organ transplantation
 Prolonged grief disorder, a syndrome consisting of a distinct set of symptoms following the death of a loved one
 Proper generalized decomposition, a numerical method for solving boundary value problems

Qualifications
 Postgraduate diploma (PgD), an academic qualification
 Professional Graduate Diploma (disambiguation), one of two UK academic qualifications
 Professional Graduate Diploma in Information Technology, an academic qualification equal to the third (final) year of a UK honors degree, awarded by the British Computer Society (BCS)
 Professional Graduate Diploma in Education, one-year course in Scotland for undergraduate degree holders

Other uses
 Partido Galeguista Demócrata, a political party in Galicia, Spain
 Punta Gorda Airport (Florida) (IATA code), formerly Charlotte County Airport, US